Baselines is the debut album of American composer Bill Laswell. It was released on June 14, 1983, by Elektra Records.

Critical reception
The Spin Alternative Record Guide wrote that the album "has no trouble conjuring up strong pop-inflected atmospheres."

Track listing

Personnel 
Adapted from the Baselines liner notes.

Musicians
Michael Beinhorn – Prophet-5, synthesizer, shortwave, tape (A1, A2, A4, B1, B2, B4, B5)
Ralph Carney – bass saxophone and contrabass clarinet (A1, A2, B1)
Fred Frith – guitar and violin (A4, B1, B4, B5)
George Lewis – trombone (A1, A2, B1, B4)
Ronald Shannon Jackson – drums (A1, A4, B1, B4, B5)
Bill Laswell – Ibanez 8-string, Fender 6-string, Fender Fretless Precision, Music Man Sting Ray, Steinberger bass
David Moss – voice, steel drum and percussion (A3, B5)
Daniel Ponce – congas (A2, A3, B2, B4)
Phillip Wilson – drums (A2)

Technical personnel
Martin Bisi – recording, drums, percussion (A3, B2, B3)
Material – producer
Howie Weinberg – mastering

Release history

References

External links 
 Baselines at Bandcamp
 

1983 debut albums
Bill Laswell albums
Celluloid Records albums
Elektra Records albums